Balyshly (Boloşlo) is a rural locality (a selo) and the administrative centre of Balyshlinsky Selsoviet, Blagovarsky District, Bashkortostan, Russia. The population was 542 as of 2010. There are 7 streets.

Geography 
Balyshly is located 22 km south of Yazykovo (the district's administrative centre) by road. Novy Bulyak is the nearest rural locality.

References 

Rural localities in Blagovarsky District